The Pimbwe are an ethnic and linguistic group based in the Rukwa Region of western Tanzania, in the neighbourhood of Mpimbwe to the northwest of Lake Rukwa

References

Ethnic groups in Tanzania
Indigenous peoples of East Africa
Rukwa languages